Adan Ronquillo: Tubong Cavite, Laking Tondo is a 1993 Filipino film directed by Joey del Rosario, starring Filipino actors Ramon "Bong" Revilla, Jr., Sheryl Cruz, and Miguel Rodriguez. The film was the initial production venture of Star Cinema, ABS-CBN's film production outfit, in collaboration with Regal Films.

Plot
Adan Ronquillo was fighting a group of thugs led by Ben Hapon and was arrested by his father. One night after setting free his father was murdered by a rogue police force led by Gardo. Hepe approaches Adan about the incident. Abad kills one of Adan's friends and leaves a message to the Hepe. Adan finds Gardo's son who was responsible for his father's death and he has been ordered by Gardo to kill him and Adan kills him. Adan finds Gardo in the warehouse and one of Gardo's police force opens fire at him. Adan kills most of Gardo's forces with a rifle with a grenade launcher. But Gardo escapes in a car with Adan chases him which they destroyed a fuel tanker as Adan shoots Gardo in the back causing him to skid his car to a stop. Adan climbs out of his damaged car as Gardo was about to fire his gun at him Adan kills him and blows his car up. Ben Hapon informs Moren of Gardo's death which enrages him.

Adan goes to his house to find her mother murdered by Ben Hapon and Karla has been captured by Moreno and he throws Ben Hapon out of the house and tells Moreno that he is coming for him. Adan goes to Moreno's Summer villa in Antipolo to rescue Karla and kills Ben Hapon. Hepe and his police forces arrive to help him and arrest Moreno's men. Moreno escapes with Karla. During the scuffle, Moreno slaps Karla causing her to fall down the hill, and badly shots her just as Adan arrives into the scene. Enraged Adan shoots Moreno with his machine gun and mourns Karla believing to have been killed by Moreno just as Hepe arrives to help him. However, Moreno is still alive and aims his machine gun at them. Adan is shot by him before he and Hepe shot Moreno to death. Karla has survived the scuffle with Moreno and was in a wheeling chair mourning Adan's death in the cemetery with Adan's friend and sister Elma. Hepe arrives and tells them that Adan survived he was only shot in the arm by Moreno before he and Hepe killed Moreno.

Cast
 Ramon "Bong" Revilla, Jr. as Adan Ronquillo
 Sheryl Cruz as Karla
 Miguel Rodriguez as Capt. Gardo Moreno
 Dante Rivero as Sgt. Pedring Ronquillo
 Ronaldo Valdez as Cesar Moreno 
 Daniel Fernando as Lt. Abad
 Rez Cortez as Paolo
 Niño Muhlach as Bunso
 King Gutierrez as Ben Hapon
 Edgar Mande as Jimboy

References

Notes

External links 
 

1993 films
Philippine drama films
Tagalog-language films
Star Cinema films
Regal Entertainment films
Films directed by Joey del Rosario